La Sape, an abbreviation based on the phrase Société des Ambianceurs et des Personnes Élégantes (French; literally "Society of Ambiance-Makers and Elegant People") and hinting to the French slang word sape which means "clothes" or sapé, which means "dressed up", is a subculture centered on the cities of Kinshasa and Brazzaville in the Democratic Republic of the Congo and Republic of Congo respectively. An adherent of La Sape is known as a sapeur or, if female, as a sapeuse. The movement embodies the elegance in style and manners of colonial predecessor dandies.

History
La sape can be traced back to the period of colonialism in Africa, particularly in the cities of Brazzaville and Kinshasa.

A major influence on the Congolese elite, present during the 1920s (the so-called Roaring Twenties), was West African colonial workers who came to the Congo. These Bapopo or Coastmen, as they were called, served as inspiration for the Congolese elite "to combat ingrained charges of inferiority leveled at them" by French and Belgian colonialism. Young Congolese men took the style of their masters’ and made it their own. In the historian Didier Gondola's essay titled "La Sape Exposed!: High Fashion Among Lower-Class Congolese", he says:

The houseboys used their connections in France to acquire their clothing.

According to Gondola, Camille Diata frontlined the sape movement in Brazzaville in the 1930s, but also had a deep influence in France. He was also part of L'Amicale, "a loosely organized anti-colonial movement," formed in France in 1926 by the imaginative Congolese revolutionary André Matsoua. The organization mainly helped Africans new to Paris get settled in the city because they were not welcomed well by the French, facing imprisonment and deportation. By the time of Matsoua's death in 1942, his political developments gained prominence in the Congo and were "hijacked" by the Congolese intellectual elite. They not only adapted the fashion sense but also his anti-colonial views. This movement became a distinctly ethnic Bakongo and Balari one characterized by potent political symbolism and ideology that would manifest in postcolonial era.

The 1950s gave rise to the cosmopolitan, thus bringing prominence to the music scene. Nightclubs and beer halls made up the venues home to the music and young urbanites of the Congolese townships of Kinshasa and Brazzaville. During the postcolonial years, the unique dynamics of La Sape coalesced in 1960 when both Congos were granted independence. Economic chaos ensued and many were left jobless. This caused numerous Congolese people to move abroad to western cities like London and Paris. Since they were also not very welcome, La Sape acted as refuge for them to cope with European life.

Papa Wemba, a Congolese musician, is credited with reviving la sape in Kinshasa during the 1970s by emphasizing the importance of smartly dressed Congolese men.

Today

Congolese dandies living in Paris and other European cities were only deemed sapeur once they returned to Brazzaville in the summer to showcase their style before the mid-1990s.

Although war and strife had riddled the Congo over the years, there has been a revival of La Sape in Brazzaville. Whereas before in the early 1980s when campaigns were being prompted to bar La Sape from public spaces, they are now well respected and are "darlings of the regime." They have been raised to a higher status of "cultural heritage" by Denis Sassou Nguesso by allowing them to participate in public cultural events like the African Exhibit of Fashion and Crafts (Salon africain de la mode et de l’artisanat).

Gondola argues that:

Cultural influences
Sapeurs were prominently featured in the 2012 music video for Solange's "Losing You."

La Sape is the theme of the 2015 music video Sapés comme jamais by the artist Maître Gims.

Sapeurs are shown in the film 35 Cows and a Kalashnikov (2014), directed by Oswald von Richthofen.

Sapeurs were featured in the 2018 music video All the Stars by the artist Kendrick Lamar.

See also
Swenkas - similar movement in South Africa
Zoot Suit
1980s in African fashion
2010s in African fashion

References

Further reading

External links

Dimanche à Brazzaville (Sunday in Brazzaville) documentary website
Dimanche à Brazzaville on Vimeo
The Sapeurs of Kinshasa on BBC World Service
The Congolese Sape photo essay by Héctor Mediavilla
Congo's dandies give new meaning to fashion victim from Agence France-Presse
Congolese dandies: Meet the stylish men and women of Brazzaville – in pictures – The Guardian

1980s fashion
2010s fashion
Culture in Brazzaville
Republic of the Congo culture
Subcultures
Fashion aesthetics
Culture of Kinshasa
African fashion